Calathus distinguendus is a species of ground beetle from the Platyninae subfamily that can be found in Bulgaria, Greece, Kosovo,  Moldova, Montenegro, North Macedonia, Serbia, Voivodina, southern part of Russia and European part of Turkey. It is also found in Georgia, Asia Minor, Caucasus, and Crimea.

References

distinguendus
Beetles described in 1846
Beetles of Europe